The Woolclassers' Association of Australia (WAA) was a trade union representing woolclassers in Australia. It amalgamated with the Australian Workers Union (AWU) in 2009. It was affiliated with the Australian Council of Trade Unions (ACTU).

External links

 WAA official site.

References

Defunct trade unions of Australia
Agriculture and forestry trade unions
Agricultural organisations based in Australia